The Lady of the Lake is a 1928 British romance film directed by James A. FitzPatrick and starring Percy Marmont, Benita Hume and Lawson Butt. It is based on the 1810 poem The Lady of the Lake by Walter Scott.

Cast
 Percy Marmont as James FitzJames 
 Benita Hume as The Lady of the Lake 
 Lawson Butt as Roderick Dhu 
 James Carew as Lord Moray 
 Haddon Mason as Malcolm Graeme 
 Hetta Bartlett as Margaret 
 Leo Dryden as Allan Bayne 
 Sara Francis as Blanche of Devon 
 James Douglas as Douglas

Production
It was made at the Islington Studios of Gainsborough Pictures. The film was originally silent, with sound added in July 1931.

References

Bibliography
 Cook, Pam. Gainsborough Pictures. Cassell, 1997.

External links

British romance films
1920s romance films
British silent feature films
Films based on works by Walter Scott
Films directed by James A. FitzPatrick
Films set in Scotland
Films set in the 16th century
1928 films
Gainsborough Pictures films
Islington Studios films
Films based on poems
British black-and-white films
Films scored by Nathaniel Shilkret
1920s English-language films
1920s British films